The 2021 Fukuoka SoftBank Hawks season was the 83rd season of the franchise in Nippon Professional Baseball, their 16th season under SoftBank Group, their 32nd season in Fukuoka, and their 28th season in Fukuoka PayPay Dome. This season was Kimiyasu Kudo's last season managing the Hawks, after a 6 year run. 2021 was also the first time the Hawks missed qualifying for the Climax Series play-offs after the 2013 season, and the first time they failed to maintain a .500 winning percentage since 2008.

Regular season 
The Hawks failed to qualify for the playoffs for the first time since 2013, going 60-62-21 with a .492 winning percentage, barely going below .500 winning percentage.

Roster

References

2021 Nippon Professional Baseball season
Fukuoka SoftBank Hawks seasons